Visakha is a male professional volleyball team based in Bangkok, Thailand. The club was founded in 2016 and plays in the Thailand league.

Honours 
Domestic competitions
Thailand League :
  Third (1): 2018–19
 Thai-Denmark Super League :
  Runner-up (1): 2018
  Third (1): 2017
 Academy League U18 Thailand League
  Runner-up (1): 2017

Former names
 NK Fitness Samutsakhon (2016–2017)
 Visakha (2018–)

League results

Current squad 
As of November 2019

Head coach:  Sarin Karnket

Head coach

Imports

Notable players

Domestic Players

 Sanan Nantayanan
 Nammon Warapa
 Kodchagorn Pongpat
 Khanit Sinlapasorn
 Yossapol Wattana
 Supachai Prajong
 Sirithep Passadu
 Adipong Phonpinyo
 Sittichai Pochaka
 Yuttana Deeraksa
 Nattawut Panjit
 Monthakarn Kotchaborrirak
 Kitsada Singam
 Ratchapoom Samthong

Foreigner Players

 Henry Chan (2017)

 Wu Zhai (2018)
 Shi Jingeng (2018),(2018–2019)

 May Rasmey (2017–2018)

 Rodrigo Da sill va (2018–2019)
 Kaio Fábio Rocha (2019–2020)

 Marck Espejo (2019–2020)

References

External links
 Official facebook

Volleyball clubs in Thailand
Volleyball clubs established in 2016